Norwood Public Schools is a school district headquartered in Norwood, Massachusetts.

Schools
Secondary:
 Norwood High School
 Dr. Philip O. Coakley Middle School (formerly Norwood Junior High South)

Elementary:
 Balch
 Callahan
 Cleveland
 Oldham
 C.J. Prescott

Preschool:
 Willett Early Childhood Center (serves preschool and kindergarten children). The public elementary schools located in Norwood include:

References

External links
 Norwood Public Schools
School districts in Massachusetts
Education in Norfolk County, Massachusetts
Norwood, Massachusetts